The Aue ( or Aue Bach) is a meandering stream in Lower Saxony, Germany.

The Aue source is near Waake. It enters the Seeburger See near Seeburg and drains it at Bernshausen. A mere creek, it is not navigable. The elevation at the mouth is about 157 m asl. There are a number of small neolithic Linear Pottery culture settlements along its banks.

See also
List of rivers of Lower Saxony

References

Rivers of Lower Saxony
Rivers of Germany